Alfredo Dinale (11 March 1900 – 3 December 1976, Vicenza) was an Italian racing cyclist and Olympic champion in track cycling.

He won the gold medal in team pursuit at the 1924 Summer Olympics in Paris.

He won the bicycle race Coppa Bernocchi in 1924.

References

External links
 
 
 

1900 births
1976 deaths
Italian male cyclists
Olympic gold medalists for Italy
Cyclists at the 1924 Summer Olympics
Olympic cyclists of Italy
Italian track cyclists
People from Marostica
Olympic medalists in cycling
Italian Giro d'Italia stage winners
Medalists at the 1924 Summer Olympics
Cyclists from the Province of Vicenza
20th-century Italian people